Serenata Guayanesa is a vocal and instrumental quartet that plays typical Venezuelan folk music. It is one of the two best known groups that play this style of music (the other being Un Solo Pueblo).

See also 
Venezuela
Music of Venezuela
Iván Pérez Rossi
Hernán Gamboa

References

External links
Unofficial website
Serenata Guayanesa Discography

Venezuelan musical groups